The Xingan salamander (Hynobius maoershanensis) is a species of salamander in the family Hynobiidae, endemic to China: it is only known from its type locality, Mao'ershan (Mount Mao'er) in the Xing'an County, Guangxi. Its natural habitats are marshes and the surrounding forests. It is threatened by habitat loss and, living close to the summit of Mao'ershan at around  asl, by climate change. It occurs within the Mao'ershan National Nature Reserve.

References

Hynobius
Amphibians described in 2006
Amphibians of China
Endemic fauna of Guangxi